Casas is a municipality located in the Mexican state of Tamaulipas.

External links
  Website

Municipalities of Tamaulipas